Govindaray H. Nayak (born 18 September 1933) was awarded the Central Sahitya Akademi Award for his work Sanskrit Chintana in 2014 
. He was a professor of Kannada at University of Mysore.

Nayak was born in Surve near Ankola, a village in coastal Karnataka, India. In 1951, Nayak earned his high school diploma from Peoples Multi-purpose High School, Ankola and a M. A. in Kannada from University of Mysore.

His works
 Sanskrit Chintana
 Nirapekshe
 Samakalina
 Nijadani
 Bendre Naada Naadu Olavu
 Moulya Marga (vol 1-5)
 Matte Matte Pampa
 Shathamanada Kannada Sahitya -1
 Harishchandra Kavya Ondu Vimarshe
 Sthitiprajne
  Krithisaakshi

Awards
 Central Sahitya Akademi Award (2014)
 Karnataka Sahitya Academy Award
 Pampa Award

References

 An article on Nayak from "Karavali Munjavu" a Kannada e-paper dated 19 September 2010.

External links
 G. H. Nayak's reminiscences of Maharaja's College, Mysore 

Kannada-language writers
Kannada people
1933 births
People from Uttara Kannada
Living people
Academic staff of the University of Mysore
Poets from Karnataka
Recipients of the Sahitya Akademi Award in Kannada